Nebria femoralis is a species of ground beetle in the Nebriinae subfamily that is endemic to northwestern part of Russia.

References

External links
Nebria femoralis at Carabidae of the World

femoralis
Beetles described in 1843
Beetles of Europe
Endemic fauna of Russia